Bernard Friot is a French sociologist and economist. He is (since 2009) an emeritus professor of Sociology, and previously taught at Paris West University Nanterre La Défense.

He's been a member of the French Communist Party (PCF) since 1970.

He began his academic career in 1971 at the University Institutes of Technology of the University of Lorraine as an assistant and then as a lecturer in economics. His economics PhD thesis relates to the building up of the French social security system between 1920 and 1980. He challenges the interpretation that makes the 1945 Social Security a necessary element of the Fordist era of capitalism. He insists instead on the "anti-capitalist nature of the institutions of socialization of wages".

He leads the European Institute of Wages and a popular education association called Réseau Salariat, which promotes the idea of a "personal qualification salary" (salaire à la qualification personnelle) as an alternative proposal to the basic income - an idea denounced by Friot as "the spare wheel of capitalism".

His research focuses on the sociology of wages and comparing social protection systems in Europe. His work has also focused on pensions, going against the French government's proposed reforms in 2010.
The living wage supported by Bernard Friot is, according to his analyse, the best subversive answer to the four main institutions of capitalism : lucrative property (not private property, only private property where profit is taken from), credit (a state does not need to borrow to finance investment), employment market (the central base of capitalism causing the blackmail to unemployment), the assessing of economic value according to the duration of working.
To be fully understood, Bernard Friot developed through Reseau-salariat many tutoring videos. His goal is to show the "dejà-là", meaning the actual waging by socialized value in the French economic system via the social security, the public employment, etc.

Bibliography 
 The Wage under Attack: Employment Policies in Europe (with Bernadette Clasquin), 2013, PIE-Peter Lang
Puissances du salariat, new expanded edition, 2012, ed. La Dispute
L’Enjeu du salaire, 2012, ed. La Dispute
Comprendre l’écologie politique, UFAL, 2012, chap. 7: "Pour une citoyenneté révolutionnaire" (interview)
L’Enjeu des retraites, 2010, ed. La Dispute
 Wage and Welfare (with Bernadette Clasquin, Nathalie Moncel and Mark Harvey), 2004, PIE-Peter Lang
 Et la cotisation sociale créera l’emploi, 1999, ed. La Dispute
La Construction sociale de l’emploi en France, des années 1960 à aujourd'hui (with José Rose), 1996, ed. L’Harmattan
Émanciper le travail - Entretiens avec Patrick Zech, 2014, Éditions La Dispute
Vaincre Macron,  2017, ed. La Dispute

References

External links 
 Interview with Radio Univers
 Institut européen du salariat
 Interview on France Inter's Là-bas_si_j'y_suis programme on the subject of pensions (23/06/2010)
 Interview on France Inter's Là-bas_si_j'y_suis programme on the subject of wages (02/04/2012)

French sociologists
French Communist Party members
Living people
1946 births
French male writers